Annette Charmayne Nainima (born 11 March 1997) is a Fijian footballer who plays as a defender for Ba FC and the Fiji women's national team.

Notes

References

1997 births
Living people
Women's association football defenders
Fijian women's footballers
Fiji women's international footballers